Events from the year 1783 in Canada.

Incumbents

Events
 American independence is formally recognized at the Treaty of Paris.
 Treaty of Paris gives Americans fishing rights off Newfoundland.
 The success of the rebellious 13 American colonies leaves the British with the poorest remnants of their New World empire and the determination to prevent a second revolution. However, they have to accommodate the roughly 50,000 refugees from the American Revolution who settle in Nova Scotia and the upper St. Lawrence. These United Empire Loyalists soon begin to agitate for the political and property rights they had previously enjoyed in the thirteen colonies.
 British North America consists of the colonies and territories of the British Empire in continental North America after the end of the American Revolutionary War and the recognition of American independence.
 More than 5,000 Black People leave the United States to live in the Maritimes, Quebec and Ontario. Having sided with the British during the American War of Independence, they come to Canada as United Empire Loyalists, some as free men and some as slaves. Although promised land by the British, they receive only varying amounts of poor-quality land, and, in fact, some receive none at all.
 In Annapolis Royal, Nova Scotia, Rose Fortune becomes Canada's first policewoman.
 The border between Canada and the U.S. is accepted from the Atlantic Ocean to Lake of the Woods.
 In the area around the mouth of the Saint John River, those who fled the thirteen American colonies by 1783 are called United Empire Loyalists. Those who arrived after 1783 were called Late Loyalists.
 Pennsylvania Germans begin moving into southwestern Ontario.
 The North West Company is formed.
 January 20 – Preliminaries of peace are signed between Great Britain and the United States.
 Vermont delays entering the Union, because Congress is partial to New York, and because of the General Government's indebtedness, for which Vermont is not bound.

Births
April 26 – Peter Boyle de Blaquière, political figure and first chancellor of the University of Toronto (d.1860)

Death
Paul Jackson

Historical documents

Postwar
Ceasefire among Britain, France and Spain includes U.S.A. and ends American Revolutionary War

Peace treaty sets U.S.-British boundary, allows U.S. fishing in Newfoundland waters and Gulf of St. Lawrence, and encourages justice for loyalists

Map: Covering James Bay to Florida and Newfoundland to Mississippi and showing United States of America according to treaty

Washington is surprised Blacks have been part of British evacuation, and wants to prevent future loss "of any Negroes or other Property"

Maj. Gen. Steuben on tour of U.S. border from Lake Champlain to mouth of Mississippi River "to view the most proper places" to locate garrisons

Washington says "Peace Establishment" should include gaining "affections" of Canadians in Detroit and Illinois country, and attracting more of them

Peace is best policy in U.S. west because even totally expelling Indigenous people would be military and economic advantage to Canada

Lords of Admiralty set peace establishment of 28-gun frigate, sloop and cutter at Quebec City and 50-gun ship and 3 frigates or sloops at Halifax

Act of Parliament appoints commissioners "to enquire into the Losses and Services of all such Persons who have suffered" for their loyalty in late war

Residents of Saratoga, N.Y. district resolve to treat any resident or returning loyalist "with the severity due to his crimes and infamous defection"

"Nothing is now so important to society" - Connecticut writer calls for  re-admission of loyalists, for sake of security, equality, rights and business

Timber for masts, spars and lumber is more plentiful in Canada and Nova Scotia than in U.S.; "almost untouched" forests of Canada better for potash

Frederick Haldimand to John Parr on his idea to encourage Acadians to settle at "Great" Falls on Saint John River, making strong link between provinces

Haldimand's vision of Loyalist settlement in "the Upper Countries," including in areas of present-day Kingston and Windsor, Ontario

"The mortifying scene of giving up the City of New York to the American Troops" - Guy Carleton looks "unusually dejected" and new inhabitants "shabby"

Lower Canada
Canada's commerce will surpass debt-ridden U.S.A. if encouraged and if Canada gets good constitution  with elected assembly and government reforms

Owner of two seigneuries lures settler Loyalists with: no rent for 10 years; wheat for family use ground 4 years for free; building boards sawed for free

"Abandoned in general by those who have conducted them in the just cause" - Refugee officers from Canada who fought for U.S. send appeal for help

Quebeckers petition House of Commons for Quebec Act repeal, elected assembly, larger legislative council, English common and commercial law etc.

Noting prevalent errors (such as giving children smallpox), writer argues influence of clergy can remove doubts of "untutored minds" about inoculation

"Negro Wench," about 18 and has had smallpox, brought from New York by Loyalists, and for sale "only from the owner having no use for her at present"

Panis woman named Mary Jeannevieve, 36, left "her Mistress [carrying] with her a large bundle;" reward of 40 shillings plus expenses

Missing "Negro Lad named Charles," about 20, 4' 4 or 5" "with a white mark on the right side of his forehead; speaks English and a little French and German"

Gazette printer's apprentice missing; Duncan McDonell, about 19, speaks English, French and Erse; one guinea reward for his return

Genevieve Dorion notes husband absent 3 months from Sorel without cause, and that she will run business on own account and will not pay his debts

Edinburgh woman has school for "Young Ladies [to learn] white and coloured Work, Tambour, Embroidery, and Dresden-work, &c." as well as millinery business

Quebec Library trustees report catalog is available to subscribers, £374 spent on books in English, but no French books received because of war

Thespian Theatre puts on tragedy Venice Preserv'd and comic opera The Padlock plus singing and music for "a most numerous and respectable audience"

François Baillairgé will draw "historical pictures" and make figures "in relievo" for parishes and paint full-length and miniature oil portraits

Acrostic poem cleverly praises Miss Hannah MacCulloch for combining charms of several other Quebec City divinities

Upper Canada
Niagara farmers want relief from "precarious footing upon which they hold their farms," perhaps buying more lakeside land from Mississaugas

"They would rather go to Japan than go among the Americans" - With no hope of justice in U.S. courts, Loyalists ask for firm tenure of their Niagara lands

John Butler thinks Indigenous people will be "very troublesome" after news that their lands are ceded to U.S.A. under peace settlement

Gen. Allan Maclean regrets great expenditure on rum, including 60 gal. for Mississaugas, and seeks guidance on how much to supply to Six Nations

Niagara merchants urge ban on traders from U.S., calling them "Smugglers [evading] the legal rates to the prejudice and ruin of the Fair Trader"

Painting: Cataraqui (Kingston, Ontario)

Nova Scotia
Listing African Americans taken to Nova Scotia, "Book of Negroes" includes Deborah, age 20, formerly enslaved by George Washington

Certificate of John Williams ("a Negro") gives him permission to go to Nova Scotia "or where ever else he may think proper"

Loyalist commander asks officer to "say a word" for George Black family; "he has long been free and[...]deserves Provision as well as other Refugees"

Free-born Black indented apprentice George Scribens "is supposed to be gone to Nova Scotia" by New York City man offering £5 reward

Alexander Hamilton thinks it bad policy to cause "a great number of useful citizens[...]to people the shores and wilderness of Nova-Scotia"

Chronicle entry for May 14: "Six thousand Refugees arrived at Port-Roseway, Nova Scotia, from New York"

Summary of accusations made against small group of Loyalists who unsuccessfully tried to convince Gov. John Parr to allow each of them 5,000 acres

"A refugee is the most miserable, dispicable being on earth" - Loyalists at Port Roseway are living in huts and almost all dependant on dole

Loyalist notes Saint John River country's "mortifications" his family would not stand: "whole country crowded," expensive towns, and rations and huts

Mary Fisher, wife of New Jersey Volunteers veteran, describes hardship of families arriving too late in fall to build housing for winter

Despite high position in loyalist forces, Edward Winslow arrives with family in Nova Scotia lacking tools, enough blankets, and even 8 pence for ferry

Loyalist glad to arrive - "[I could] enlarge upon the subject that has brought us all to this uncultivated country, but[...]it can answer no good purpose"

"State of poverty" - Edward and Sarah Winslow's father applies for compensation based on loss of his £1,500 estate and income of £300 in Massachusetts

Master of transport ship run aground off Cape Sable appears responsible for mishap, and also reportedly abandons passengers and discourages their rescue

"Replete with natural advantages & nothing wanting but numbers of industrious Inhabitants" - Praise for Nova Scotia's produce, grain, fish and timber

Description of soil in marshes behind dykes, with claims of great crops produced and yields sustained "without change of grain, rest, or manure"

List of persons living on Saint John River includes their names, number of children, properties, experience in war (if any), and character assessments

Commission to identify for Supreme Court persons compensated in suits against aiders and abettors of raiders for more than they suffered in raids

Royal pardon for "all Manner of Treasons, Misprison of Treasons, treasonable and seditious Words, Libels or Correspondence" committed during late war

Decades-old laws prohibiting Catholics from having title to "Lands or Tenements" and subjecting priests to imprisonment are repealed

House of Assembly records judges' report that Cumberland County suffered and suffers under damage and persecution growing out of 1776 rebel invasion

Assembly committee gives many instances of unnecessary, unrecorded, unreported, unauthorized, unpaid, improperly paid, confused or abused public accounts

Licence for 11,520 acres of land on Sheet Harbour for Indigenous people

Map: Nova Scotia with its fishing banks and nearby New England, Quebec, Newfoundland, and St. John's Isle

Prince Edward Island
Coast of St. John's Island "abounds with every sort of fish; the soil of the island is excellent; [and] no country in the world affords better pasture for cattle"

Officers of King's Rangers on St. John's Island inform Loyalists of its good soil, climate, water and waterways, and "very few[,] very light" taxes

John MacDonald describes nature and resolution of problems he has had keeping family property on St. John's Island, and foresees further problems

Labrador
George Cartwright says "celebrated natural historian" who claims beavers have scaly tails because they eat fish, must himself have one for same reason

Cartwright's lengthy description of beavers includes their food and food storage, shelters and preferred locations, dams, families, work etc.

See also
1782 in Canada

References 

 
Canada
83